Andol is a small settlement in the hills north of Sodražica in southern Slovenia. It lies in the Municipality of Ribnica. The area is part of the traditional region of Lower Carniola and is now included in the Southeast Slovenia Statistical Region.

References

External links
 
 Andol on Geopedia
 Andol Map: Detailed maps for the city of Andol

Populated places in the Municipality of Ribnica